GSMC may refer to :

 the Galileo Security Monitoring Centre, of the European satellite positioning and navigation system Galileo
 the Georgia Society for Managed Care, a member organization part of the Georgia Hospital Association, United States.